Nedim Buza (born May 10, 1995) is a Bosnian professional basketball player for Spars Ilidža of the Bosnian League.

Professional career
Buza started his career with Spars Sarajevo. On April 24, 2015, he announced that he would enter the 2015 NBA draft.

At the 2015 Nike Hoop Summit, Buza participated for the World Select Team (against the USA Select Team), and recorded 6 points.

On June 6, 2015, he signed with Belgian team Telenet Oostende.

On August 26, 2019, Buza signed for Spars Ilidža.

Awards and accomplishments

Club
Oostende
2x Belgian League (2016, 2017)
2x Belgian Basketball Cup (2016, 2017)

Bosnian national team
Junior national team 
2014 FIBA Europe Under-20 Championship Division B:

Individual
2013 Nike International Junior Tournament: All-Tournament Team

References

External links
 Nedim Buza at draftexpress.com
 Nedim Buza at eurobasket.com
 Nedim Buža at fiba.com

1995 births
Living people
BC Oostende players
Bosnia and Herzegovina men's basketball players
OKK Spars players
People from Visoko
Small forwards